Brezolupy is a village and municipality in Bánovce nad Bebravou District in the Trenčín Region of north-western Slovakia.

History
In historical records the village was first mentioned in 1323.

Geography
The municipality lies at an altitude of 200 metres and covers an area of 6.338 km². It has a population of about 475 people.

Genealogical resources

The records for genealogical research are available at the state archive "Statny Archiv in Nitra, Slovakia"

 Roman Catholic church records (births/marriages/deaths): 1679-1895 (parish B)

See also
 List of municipalities and towns in Slovakia

External links
 Official page
 https://web.archive.org/web/20071116010355/http://www.statistics.sk/mosmis/eng/run.html
Surnames of living people in Brezolupy

Villages and municipalities in Bánovce nad Bebravou District